Zoe Terakes (born March 22, 2000) is an Australian actor who most notably played Reb Keane in Wentworth.

Education 
Terakes attended SCEGGS Darlinghurst for high school. Terakes had not considered acting as a career, until their grade 11 drama teacher recommended visiting an agent who ended up securing them work. They completed their HSC whilst appearing on stage in A View from the Bridge, a theatre production in Sydney from director Iain Sinclair.

Career 
Their work on A View from the Bridge led them to receive Sydney Theatre Awards for Best Female Actor in a Supporting Role in an Independent Production, and as joint winner, the Best Newcomer Award. The production also scored Terakes a Helpmann Award nomination.

At the age of 17, Terakes made their on-screen debut in the role of Pearl Perati, a homeless teenager, in ABC's Janet King alongside Marta Dusseldorp.

Other theatre credits of Terakes include Metamorphoses and The Wolves for The Old Fitz and Henrik Ibsen's theatre production of A Doll's House Part 2 at the Melbourne Theatre Company.

Terakes played transgender man Reb Keane in season eight of Australian TV series Wentworth, the critically acclaimed reboot of Prisoner Cell Block H. About the experience of obtaining the role, Terakes stated: "I really fought for it. I emailed the producers to let them know how important it was to have a trans person telling this story. It was also terrifying, because suddenly I had the role and I felt the weight of the trans community on my shoulders. I didn't want to get it wrong." Their character, Reb, was a trans man (assigned female at birth) and was terrified of being sentenced to prison after a robbery goes wrong.

In 2020, the feature film Ellie & Abbie (& Ellie's Dead Aunt) was released where Terakes plays the title role of Abbie. In the same year, Terakes appeared in the Foxtel drama about euthanasia titled The End.

In 2021, Terakes played wellness retreat worker Glory alongside Nicole Kidman, Asher Keddie and Melissa McCarthy in Nine Perfect Strangers.

In 2022, Terakes joined the cast of the Marvel project Ironheart.

Personal life 
Terakes identifies as non-binary and transmasculine, and came out to the acting industry at age 19. In 2022, Terakes confirmed news of their gender confirming surgery.

In November 2020, Terakes signed a petition criticizing the lack of LGBTQ representation in the Australian production of Hedwig and the Angry Inch and expressing “disappointment” over the casting of actor Hugh Sheridan in the lead role of Hedwig, whom many believe to be a transgender character. They, along with David Campbell, Michaela Banas, and others, shared an open letter on Instagram addressed to the Sydney Festival, explaining why trans representation is vital when telling the story of a trans character. The Australian producers, Showtune Productions, cancelled the show.

Filmography

Film

Television

References 

Living people
Australian television actors
Australian non-binary actors
Australian film actors
Transgender non-binary people
2000 births
Transgender actors
Australian LGBT actors